"Greyhound" is a single by the Swedish house music supergroup Swedish House Mafia. The track was released worldwide on 12 March 2012 as the third single from the album Until Now, released as a digital download on the iTunes Store. The song was created to promote a new drink for Absolut, Absolut Greyhound. It contains a sped-up sample of Hans Zimmer's "Time" from Inception movie score. It was used in the first episode of season 2 of the Spanish thriller television series Elite.

Music video
An official music video to accompany the release of "Greyhound" was first released onto YouTube on 13 March 2012 at a total length of 3:31. The video starts with a man in goggles sticking a pole into a salt desert. The members of Swedish House Mafia—Axwell, Sebastian Ingrosso, and Steve Angello—are then seen donning holographic headsets in an underground room. The headsets create colored bubbles around the members of Swedish House Mafia; Axwell in yellow, Ingrosso in blue, and Angello in red. As dog racers arrive on the track, the three men are connected to three robot greyhound dogs and prepare them for the race. A woman lays a hovering rabbit on the ground, which starts moving to commence the race as the dogs chase it. The video alternates between scenes of the race, shots of the supporters, and scenes of Axwell, Ingrosso and Angello controlling the dogs. Axwell temporarily disables Ingrosso's greyhound, but he quickly recovers and catches up. As the onlookers crowd together in anticipation, the three dogs reach the finishing line at the same time. A polaroid camera develops a photo of the finish, which is blown away into the desert. The video finishes with a shot of a bottle of Absolut Greyhound on a silver tray.

Track listings

Charts

Weekly charts

Year-end charts

Certifications

Release history

References

2012 singles
2012 songs
Songs written by Axwell
Songs written by Sebastian Ingrosso
Songs written by Steve Angello
Swedish House Mafia songs
Virgin Records singles